Mohan Sherry is an Indian actor of Bollywood who is known for his role as villain's henchman. His best roles are in Ram Balram, Deewaar and Trishul etc.

Filmography

References

External links
 

Indian male film actors
Male actors in Hindi cinema
20th-century Indian male actors
Possibly living people